The acronym NASC can refer to:
 North American Scrabble Championship, now known as the Scrabble Players Championship
 National Access and Scaffolding Confederation, a national trade body for access and scaffolding in the UK 
 National Association of State Comptrollers
 National Association of Student Councils, a U.S. student organization
 National Aeronautics and Space Council
 Naval Air Systems Command (NAVAIR), the command of the United States Navy which provides material support for naval aircraft and airborne weapons systems
 Necessary and sufficient condition, in logic and mathematics
 New Age Standard Comic, the subtitle of Monthly Dragon Age.
 North American Solar Challenge, a solar car race in the United States and Canada
 North American Spondylitis Consortium, a genetic project funded through the University of Texas Health Science Centre, Houston
 North Augusta, South Carolina
 Nottingham Arabidopsis Stock Centre, the European collection and distribution centre for the model plant Arabidopsis
 Number Administration and Service Center (NASC)
 National Airborne Service Corps, agency in Taiwan dealing with emergency-related transportation
 National Association of Sports Coaches UK sports coach association

It can also refer to:
 Nasc, an Irish independent, non-governmental migrant rights centre in Ireland, based in Cork